The AAAW (All Asia Athlete Women's) Single Championship or AAAW Championship is a women's professional wrestling championship formerly contested in the Japanese women's professional wrestling promotion Gaea Japan until 2005 after the promotion was closed down. Originally a heavyweight championship, the weight class was dropped in 1998, making it an openweight title. On March 12, 2021 it was announced that the AAAW Singles Championship would be revived, along with the AAAW Tag Team Championship, at the GAEAISM show on April 29. It was revived in January 2022 and began being sanctioned by Marvelous That's Women Pro Wrestling ever since.

Title history 

There have been a total of 15 reigns shared between 10 different champions and one vacancy. Chikayo Nagashima is the current champion in her second reign.

Names

Reigns

Combined reigns 

References

External links
AAAW Single Championship title history

Women's professional wrestling championships
Gaea Japan championships